Leptospermum speciosum is a species of shrub that is endemic to eastern Australia. It has pale bark that is shed in strips, broadly lance-shaped to elliptical leaves, white flowers arranged singly or in groups of up to three in leaf axils, and small, woody fruit that falls off when mature.

Description
It has pale bark that is shed in strips, the younger stems covered with fine hairs.

Taxonomy
Leptospermum speciosum was formally described in 1843 by Johannes Conrad Schauer in Walper's book Repertorium Botanices Systematicae.

Distribution and habitat
Leptospermum speciosum grows in heath in coastal swamps south from Fraser Island in Queensland to near the Clarence River in New South Wales.

References

speciosum
Myrtales of Australia
Flora of New South Wales
Flora of Queensland
Plants described in 1843
Taxa named by Johannes Conrad Schauer